The Wayne Gretzky International Award is a lifetime achievement award given by the United States Hockey Hall of Fame. It was established in 1999, to honor international individuals who have made major contributions to the growth and advancement of ice hockey in the United States. The award is special recognition for contributions by those not inducted into the Hall of Fame. It was first presented to its namesake Wayne Gretzky, and has been subsequently awarded at the Hall of Fame induction ceremony.

Recipients

References

1999 establishments in the United States
American ice hockey trophies and awards
Awards established in 1999
Ice hockey in the United States
Wayne Gretzky